Thomas Zhao Duomo or Kexun (born 1924) is a Chinese Roman Catholic prelate, who is serving as a Bishop of the Roman Catholic Diocese of Xuanhua since 2007.

Biography
Bishop Zhao Duomo was born in 1924. Is little known regarding his personal details, but he was ordained as a priest in 1951. He was clandestinely consecrated as auxiliary bishop of the Roman Catholic Diocese of Xuanhua by clandestine bishop Joseph Wei Jingyi from the Apostolic Prefecture of Qiqihar on 17 February 2004 in northwestern Hebei Province. And from 13 July 2007 he become the diocesan bishop of the same diocese.

References

1924 births
Living people
21st-century Roman Catholic bishops in China